Ines Amon  (born 13 July 1992) is a retired Slovenian handball player for RK Krim and the Slovenian national team.

She was selected to represent Slovenia at the 2017 World Women's Handball Championship.

References

1992 births
Living people
Slovenian female handball players
Sportspeople from Celje
Competitors at the 2018 Mediterranean Games
Mediterranean Games bronze medalists for Slovenia
Mediterranean Games medalists in handball
21st-century Slovenian women